Jesús Bermúdez Tórrez (24 January 1902 – 3 January 1945) was a Bolivian footballer who played as a goalkeeper. He was a member of the Bolivia national team in the 1926 South American Championship, the 1927 South American Championship, and the 1930 FIFA World Cup. He saved 45 goals in 8 games.

Club career
He played for Oruro Royal and Club San José. Oruro Royal's stadium, Estadio Jesús Bermúdez, is named after him.

Personal life
His wife, Alicia Tobar Loayza (September 15, 1904 – August 19, 2015), died at the age of 110. They had four children.

References

External links

1902 births
1945 deaths
People from Oruro, Bolivia
Bolivian footballers
Bolivia international footballers
Association football goalkeepers
1930 FIFA World Cup players
Club San José players